This is a list of Schools in Cabuyao, in the province of Laguna, Philippines.

College schools and universities

The following are colleges and universities situated in Cabuyao:

National High Schools

List of public/national high schools in Cabuyao:

Private High Schools

The list of private high schools in Cabuyao:

Elementary schools

Primary education and basic learning are well taught among the eighty four (84) both public and private Elementary Schools in Cabuyao, Laguna

Public

The list of public elementary schools in Cabuyao, Laguna:

District Supervisor: Dr. Edna F. Hemedez

Private

The list of private elementary schools found in Cabuyao, Laguna:

Special Education

The only special education school that can be found in Laguna is located in Cabuyao.

 The Academy of Hope (TAoH)

References

External links

Education in Cabuyao
Schools in Laguna (province)